Calliostoma comptum is a species of sea snail, a marine gastropod mollusk in the family Calliostomatidae.

Some authors place this taxon in the subgenus Calliostoma (Fautor)

Description
The size of the shell varies between 7 mm and 13 mm. The very solid, imperforate shell has a conical shape. It is flesh-colored, painted with radiating white streaks, the apex blackish-violet. The granulate whorls are a little convex, the last one rounded-angulate, above a little concave. The granules of the surface are hemispherical, closely crowded. The superior whorls are entirely flat and contain 6 or 8 granulate cinguli, close, separated by a narrow granulate line. The base of the shell is granose-cingulate, with about 8 principal cinguli, alternating with smaller ones. The aperture is rhomboidal and depressed. The outer lip is superficially sulcate within, corresponding to the principal lirae of the outer surface. The columella is oblique, somewhat twisted, cylindrical, without tooth at its base.

Distribution
This marine species occurs off New South Wales to Western Australia; off Japan

References

 Iredale, T. & McMichael, D.F. (1962). A reference list of the marine Mollusca of New South Wales. Memoirs of the Australian Museum. 11 : 1–109
 Herbert D.G. (1996) A critical review of the trochoidean types in the Muséum d'Histoire naturelle, Bordeaux (Mollusca, Gastropoda). Bulletin du Muséum national d'Histoire naturelle, Paris, ser. 4, 18 (A, 3–4): 409–445.
 Wilson, B. (1993). Australian Marine Shells. Prosobranch Gastropods. Kallaroo, WA : Odyssey Publishing. Vol.1 1st Edn pp. 1–408

External links
 

comptum
Gastropods described in 1855